The Quebec Boundary Extension Act, 1898 was an Act of the Parliament of Canada that expanded the territory of the province of Quebec. The province's northern boundary was set along the eastern shore of James Bay to the mouth of the Eastmain River, north along the river, then due east to the Hamilton River and down the river to the western boundary of Labrador. The area was part of the North-West Territories, formerly Rupert's Land, claimed by Britain in 1670.

The first of two such acts, a second Act was passed by the Parliament in 1912 and entitled the Quebec Boundaries Extension Act, 1912. Together, these two expansions more than tripled the size of the Province of Quebec to what it is today.

1898 in Quebec
1898 in Canadian law
Canadian federal legislation
Political history of Quebec
Borders of Quebec